Paul Kronk (born 22 September 1954) is a former tennis player from Australia.

Kronk won nine doubles titles during his professional career. The big-serving right-hander reached his highest singles ATP ranking in April 1976, when he was No. 78 in the world. His highest doubles ranking of world No. 35 was achieved in January 1982. Kronk was a runner-up in the US Open and a two-time runner-up in the Australian Open, on all occasions partnering compatriot Cliff Letcher.

Grand Slam finals

Doubles: 3 (3 runner-ups)

Career finals

Doubles (9 wins, 10 losses)

Notes

References

External links
 
 

1954 births
Living people
Australian male tennis players
Australian Open (tennis) junior champions
Australian people of Dutch descent
Sportspeople from Toowoomba
Tennis people from Queensland
Grand Slam (tennis) champions in boys' singles